Re Diplock or Ministry of Health v Simpson [1951] AC 251 is an English trusts law and unjust enrichment case, concerning tracing and an action for money had and received.

Facts
Various charities, including the Royal Sailors Orphans Girls’ School and Home and Dr Barnardo’s Homes had wrongly been paid money by personal representatives under Mr Caleb Diplock’s will, which left £263,000. The representatives mistakenly believed a clause in the will was valid. Some money went to be used to improve and repair other property. But the trust was held to be invalid in a decision of the House of Lords, called Chichester Diocesan Fund and Board of Finance Incorporated v Simpson. The next of kin, including Cornelius Simpson, claimed that the money should be repaid by the recipients.

Judgment

Court of Appeal
The Court of Appeal rejected the claimant’s claim for a charge over newly built buildings. It allowed a claim for equitable tracing in the mixed funds held by the charities. For mixed funds not held in current accounts, as for Royal Sailor’s, the claimants held a proportionate share. For funds held in current accounts, as for Dr Barnado’s, the first in first out rule was applicable.

Lord Greene MR said the following.

Wrottesley LJ and Evershed LJ concurred.

House of Lords
The House of Lords upheld Court of Appeal that the next of kin, including Simpson, had a personal equitable remedy against the charities to recover the money, once the claims against the personal representatives were exhausted.

Lord Simonds discussed why a mistake of law was different from a mistake of fact, because ignorantia juris neminem excusat. He then continued on the question of receiving property.

Lord Normand, Lord Oaksey, Lord Morton and Lord MacDermott concurred.

See also

English trusts law

Notes

References

English trusts case law
1951 in case law
1951 in British law
House of Lords cases